Sophie Hansson (born 2 August 1998) is a Swedish swimmer. She competed in the women's 100 metre breaststroke event at the 2016 Summer Olympics. Her older sister Louise Hansson is also a competitive swimmer.

References

External links
 NC State bio
 

1998 births
Living people
Swedish female breaststroke swimmers
Olympic swimmers of Sweden
Swimmers at the 2016 Summer Olympics
Swimmers at the 2020 Summer Olympics
Swimmers at the 2014 Summer Youth Olympics
European Aquatics Championships medalists in swimming
Medalists at the FINA World Swimming Championships (25 m)
21st-century Swedish women